Carlos Henrique de Oliveira  or simply  Carlinhos  (born January 18, 1986) is a central-defender player from Brazil.

Made his professional debut on August 6, 2006 against Botafogo in a 1-1 draw, after a swift rise through the Under-20 team. He was loaned to América-SP for the 2007 season.

Honours
Brazilian League: 2006

Contract
16 August 2006 to 16 August 2008

External links
 rsssfbrasil no.379
 sambafoot
 CBF

1986 births
Living people
Brazilian footballers
São Paulo FC players
América Futebol Clube (SP) players
Association football defenders